Kohtla Parish was an Estonian municipality located in Ida-Viru County. It has a population of 1640 (2014) and an area of 101 km².

Villages
Amula, Järve, Kaasikaia, Kaasikvälja, Kabelimetsa, Kohtla, Kukruse, Mõisamaa, Ontika, Paate, Peeri, Roodu, Saka, Servaääre, Täkumetsa, Valaste, Vitsiku.

References

External links 
 Official website 

Former municipalities of Estonia